Somkhiti was an ambiguous geographic term used in medieval and early modern Georgian historical sources to refer to Armenia on one hand and to the Armeno-Georgian marchlands along the river valleys of Debed and Khrami on the other hand. In the 18th century, "Somkhiti" was largely replaced with "Somkheti" (სომხეთი) as a Georgian exonym for Armenia, but it continued, for some time, to denote the frontier region which is currently divided between Lori, Armenia, and Kvemo Kartli, Georgia. This patch of land was sometimes referred to as "Georgian Armenia" in the 19th-century European sources.

Etymology 
 
The term "Somkhiti"/"Somkheti" is presumed by modern scholars to have been derived from "Sukhmi" or "Sokhmi", the name of an ancient land located by the Assyrian and Urartian records along the upper Euphrates. According to Professor David Marshall Lang,

See also
Mirimanidze
Saberdzneti

References 

Geographic history of Armenia
Geographic history of Georgia (country)